Frederiksberg Kommune is a municipality (Danish, kommune) on the island of Zealand (Sjælland) in Denmark. Part of the Capital Region of Denmark and the city of Copenhagen, it is surrounded by Copenhagen Municipality. The municipality, co-extensive with its seat, covers a total area (land and water) of  according to the Municipal Key Figures and has a population of 103,608 (1. January 2022) making it the smallest municipality in Denmark area-wise, the seventh most populous, and the most densely populated. Its mayor is Michael Vindfeldt from the Social Democrats serving from 1 January 2022.

The city of Frederiksberg is the only town in the municipality, and is therefore the site of its municipal council.

Frederiksberg is located as an enclave within the municipality of Copenhagen, the national capital. The municipality was originally situated west of Copenhagen, but after a number of smaller municipalities were merged with Copenhagen in 1901, it became surrounded by Copenhagen.

Frederiksberg was one of the three last Danish municipalities not belonging to a County—the others being Copenhagen and Bornholm. On 1 January 2007, the municipality lost its county privileges and became part of Region Hovedstaden (i.e. the Copenhagen Capital Region).

Frederiksberg municipality was not merged with other municipalities as the result of nationwide Kommunalreformen ("The Municipal Reform" of 2007).

Politics

Municipal council
As of 2022 Frederiksberg's municipal council consists of 29 members, elected every four years.

Below are the municipal councils elected since the Municipal Reform of 2007.

Mayors

Main sights

 Frederiksberg Campus (University of Copenhagen)
 Frederiksberg Gardens
 Frederiksberg Hospital
 Frederiksberg Palace
 Frederiksberg Town Hall
 Copenhagen Business School
 Copenhagen Zoo
 Royal Danish Military Academy
 Church of the Deaf
 Listed buildings in Frederiksberg Municipality

Twin towns – sister cities

Frederiksberg is twinned with:

 Bærum, Norway
 Hafnarfjörður, Iceland
 Hämeenlinna, Finland
 Qeqertarsuatsiaat, Greenland
 Tartu, Estonia
 Tórshavn, Faroe Islands
 Uppsala, Sweden

Notable residents
 Claes Bang, actor (Taxa, Dracula)

Gallery

See also
 Frederiksberg station

References

 Municipal statistics: NetBorger Kommunefakta, delivered from KMD aka Kommunedata (Municipal Data)
 Municipal mergers and neighbors: Eniro new municipalities map

External links

 Municipality's official website

 
Enclaves and exclaves
Copenhagen metropolitan area
Municipalities in the Capital Region of Denmark
Municipalities of Denmark